The Secret Life of Us is an Australian television drama series set in the beachside neighbourhood of St Kilda, a suburb of Melbourne, Victoria, Australia. It is primarily a drama with some comedic moments. The series was produced by Southern Star Group and screened in Australia from 2001 to 2005 on Network Ten and on Channel 4 in the UK. Initially co-funded by the two networks, Channel 4 pulled out after the third series and the fourth series was not aired in the UK. The series won three silver Logie Awards.

It has been shown in other countries such as New Zealand (TV3) where it is rated R16 in New Zealand for offensive language and sex scenes; Ireland (RTÉ Two), Canada (SuperChannel3), the Netherlands (Yorin), France (Canal Plus, France 4), Estonia (ETV, Kanal 11), Norway (NRK), Serbia (B92, TV Avala), Russia (TNT, Muz TV), Israel (Channel 2), South Africa (M-Net), and the United States (Hulu).

Plot
The show revolves around a group of friends in their mid 20s to early 30s who live in a St Kilda block of flats. Their interaction with one another, relationships with other friends, and romantic interests, along with their personal and career developments, are featured.

The actual block is 14A Acland Street, St. Kilda and the rooftop is at the Belvedere Flats on the Esplanade in the same suburb.

History and popularity
The series had its genesis in a telemovie; a 22-episode first season was commissioned by the Ten Network before the movie screened. As its popularity rose, issues arose between the show's creators and Network Ten, which saw higher ratings when it screened before 9:30. This necessitated cutting scenes with sexual themes.

The inclusion of a prominent Aboriginal character (Kelly Lewis, played by Deborah Mailman) attracted comment at the time of the series' broadcast, and has since been cited as a landmark in the history of media representations of Indigenous Australians.

The show's ratings began to dwindle following the departure of several key actors and the introduction of new characters and cast members. This began in the second season with the departure of Joel Edgerton and Damian De Montemas. It was the third season that featured a particularly high character turnover, and included the departure of key original cast members Claudia Karvan and Abi Tucker.

Five main cast members – Sibylla Budd, Spencer McLaren, Dan Spielman, Nina Liu, and Gigi Edgley – left at the end of season three and original lead Samuel Johnson left early in season four, followed by Michael Dorman three episodes later. Original cast members Deborah Mailman and David Tredinnick continued, and seven new regular characters were added for season four. The changes were part of a larger overhaul which had the arrival of a new producer, a new script producer, and a new writing team.

Cast and characters 

Regular stars
 Deborah Mailman as Kelly Lewis (Seasons 1–4, Episodes 1-86)
 Samuel Johnson as Evan Wylde (Seasons 1–4, Episodes 1-72)
 David Tredinnick as Simon Felix Trader (Seasons 1–4, 86 episodes)
 Sibylla Budd as Gabrielle Kovitch (Seasons 1–3, Episodes 1-66)
 Spencer McLaren as Richie Andrew Blake (Seasons 1–3, Episodes 1-66)
 Abi Tucker as Miranda Lang (Seasons 1–3, Episodes 1-56)
 Claudia Karvan as Dr. Alex Christensen (Seasons 1–3, Episodes 1-50, 64-66)
 Damian De Montemas as Jason Kennedy (Seasons 1–2, Episodes 1-44)
 Joel Edgerton as Will McGill (Seasons 1–2, Episodes 1-30, 42-43)
 Michael Dorman as Christian Edwards (Seasons 2–4, Episodes 31-75)
 Dan Spielman as Dr. Patrick A.K.A. "Tidy" (Season 3, Episodes 45-66)
 Nina Liu as Chloe (Season 3, Episodes 45-66)
 Gigi Edgley as Georgina "George" (Season 3, Episodes 52-65)
 Sullivan Stapleton as Justin Davies (Seasons 3–4, Episodes 62-86)
 Stephen Curry as Stuart Woodcock (Season 4, Episodes 67-86)
 Brooke Harman as Bree Sanzaro (Season 4, Episodes 67-86)
 Nicholas Coghlan as Adam Beckwith (Season 4, Episodes 67-86)
 Alexandra Schepisi as Lucy Beckwith (Season 4, Episodes 67-86)
 Anna Torv as Nicola "Nikki" Martel (Season 4, Episodes 67-86)
 Ryan Johnson as Zelko Milanovic (Season 4, Episodes 73-86)

Recurring guest stars
 Steve Mouzakis as Paolo (Season 1)
 Jessica Gower as Samantha Conrad (Season 1)
 Catherine McClements as Carmen (Season 1)
 Tasma Walton as Leah (Season 1)
 Tempany Deckert as Andrena (Season 1)
 Susie Porter as Pandora (Season 1)
 Damian Walshe-Howling as Mac (Season 1)
 Kenneth Ransom as Brad (Season 1)
 Todd MacDonald as Nathan Lieberman (Seasons 1–3)
 Alice Garner as Caitlin (Seasons 1–2)
 Oscar Redding as Eric (Season 1)
 Diana Glenn as Jemima Taylor (Seasons 2–4)
 Vince Colosimo as Anthony 'Rex' Mariani (Seasons 2–3)
 Jacek Koman as Dominic (Season 2)
 Murray Bartlett as Nick (Season 2)
 Torquil Neilson as Jake (Season 3)
 Pia Miranda as Talia (Seasons 3-4)
 Pamela Rabe as Luciana (Season 3)
 Rhys Muldoon as Frank Goodman (Season 3–4)
 Aaron Pedersen as Corey Mailins (Season 4)
 Jonathon Dutton as Jeff (Season 4)
 Mark Priestley as Marcus Nelson (Season 4)
 Ben Mendelsohn as Rob (Season 4)
 Chris Vance as Piers (Season 4)

Episodes

Series ratings

Cancellation
Production ended in 2004 with the completion of the fourth season. The decision had been made to discontinue production after the first three episodes of the fourth season aired in Australia to disastrously low ratings. At that time, the program was removed from its primetime slot. The unscreened episodes from that final season were broadcast with little publicity in late 2005.

DVD releases

See also 
 List of Australian television series

References

External links
 The Secret Life of Us at the Australian Television Information Archive
 
 The Secret Life of Us at the National Film and Sound Archive
 "The Secret Life of Us - Now or Never" at Australian Screen Online

Australian television soap operas
Australian comedy-drama television series
2001 Australian television series debuts
2005 Australian television series endings
2000s Australian drama television series
Network 10 original programming
Television series by Endemol Australia
Television shows set in Melbourne